The Schuman tunnel is a 970m long rail tunnel in Brussels.  It passes beneath avenue Clovis, square Ambiorix and the boulevard Charlemagne.  The line running through it is the double track line 161 (Brussels-Namur).  The speed limit in the tunnel is 50 km/h.

The northern portal is under the Chaussée de Louvain station in Saint-Josse-ten-Noode.  The southern end contains the Brussels-Schuman station.  The tunnel passes around the back of the Berlaymont building.  Travelling northwards, the Schuman tunnel is followed by the Deschanel tunnel then the Josaphat tunnel.

The tunnel takes its name from the politician Robert Schuman

References

Transport in Brussels
Railway tunnels in Belgium